This is a complete episode listing for the anime series Gungrave. Produced by Madhouse, the series is an adaption of the third-person shooter Gungrave, with original characters designed by Yasuhiro Nightow. The series premiered in Japan on October 7, 2003 on TV Tokyo and ended on March 30, 2004, running for twenty-six episodes. Each episode aired on the subsequent day on Aichi Television Broadcasting and then another day later on Television Osaka.

It was licensed for Region 1 release by Geneon, which aired the English dubbed episodes periodically on G4 and on Anime Unleashed.

Episodes

References
General
 

Specific

Episodes
Gungrave